Áine Ní Ghlinn  is a bilingual Irish journalist, poet, playwright and children's writer. She is the current Laureate na nÓg ("Children's Laureate"), —2023, the first to write exclusively in Irish.

Life and work
Ní Ghlinn was born in County Tipperary. She went to the Presentation Convent in Thurles and then to University College Dublin where she got her degree in Irish and English. She went on to complete her Higher Diploma in Education. She initially worked as a secondary teacher. Ní Ghlinn later went to the London School of Journalism where she gained a Diploma in Journalism. Her M.A. in Creative Writing is from Lancaster University. She lives in Dublin.

Ní Ghlinn teaches creative writing to all ages, especially in Gaelscoileanna (i.e. Irish speaking schools.) She leads workshops for teachers on Irish language and literature. Some of the topics that she covers in her poetry are difficult subjects like the abuse of children or an emigrants journey

She has won various awards for adult and children's poetry, drama, fiction. She received various bursaries from Foras na Gaeilge and from the Irish Arts Council. 
In 2002 she was awarded the Foras na Gaeilge Award at Seachtain na Scríbhneoirí in Listowel. She also won the Foras na Gaeilge award at Seachtain na Scríbhneoirí, Listowel in 2019 and 2020. Then in 2003 she won the Gradam Chlann Lir with Céard tá sa Bhosca?  In 2003 she won both the Irish-language prize at the Strokestown poetry festival and the Dun Laoghaire / Rathdown poetry competition. She was shortlisted for the Children's Books Ireland award for Brionglóidí & Aistir Eile (2008). She again won Duais de hÍde at Strokestown Poetry Festival in 2019 and 2020.

She was awarded Oireachtas prizes for drama and for her books, Fuadach, Tromluí, Daideo, Hata Zú Mhamó, Boscadán  and Úbalonga. In 2010 was awarded an IBBY honour award.  Daideo also won the Gradam Réics Carlo Irish language Book of the Year in 2014. Nílim ag Iarraidh Dul ar Scoil was shortlisted in the same year. Hata Zú Mhamó and Boscadán also wond Gradam Réics Carló Irish Language Book of the Year award.

In 2019 she was awarded a Patrick Kavanagh Fellowship for poetry. She became Ireland's sixth  Laureate na nÓg.

Bibliography

Poetry collections
 An Chéim Bhriste (Baile Átha Cliath, Coiscéim, 1984)
 Gairdín Pharthais (Coiscéim, 1988)
 Deora Nár Caoineadh/Unshed Tears (Dublin, The Dedalus Press/ Coiscéim, 1996).
 Tostanna (Coiscéim)
 An Guth Baineann (LeabhairCOMHAR)

Non-fiction works for teenage readers
 Mná as an nGnáth (Baile Átha Cliath, An Gúm, 1990)
 Daoine agus Déithe (An Gúm, 1996)
 Fadó Riamh (LeabhairCOMHAR, 2019)

Children's fiction
 Nílim ag Iarraidh dul ar Scoil (O'Brien Press)
 LeabhairCOMHAR/Daifní Díneasár (O'Brien Press)
 Moncaí Dána (O'Brien Press)
 Lámhainní Glasa (O'Brien Press)
 Éasca Péasca (O'Brien Press)
 Thar an Trasnán (O'Brien Press)
 An Leaba Sciathánach
 Céard atá sa Bhosca (An Gúm)
 Glantachán Earraigh (An Gúm)
 Madra Meabhrach (Cois Life)
 Fuadach (Cois Life)
 Tromluí (Cois Life)
 Cuairteoir (Cois Life)
 Úbalonga (Cois Life), (Séideán Sí)
 Daideo (Cois Life, 2014)
 Hata Zú Mhamó (Cois Life, 2016)
 An Múinteoir Nua (Séideán Sí)
 Boscadán (Cois Life, 2019)

Poetry for children
 Brionglóidí (Cló Mhaigh Eo)
 Bronntanais (Cló Mhaigh Eo)

Drama for children
 Éaló ón Zú (Cló Mhaigh Eo)

Further reading
  Migration and identity in 20th Century and contemporary Irish Language literature
 Celtic Culture: Aberdeen breviary-celticism, Volume 1 of Celtic Culture: A Historical Encyclopedia, John T. Koch, ABC-CLIO, 2006, 
 Best of Irish poetry 2007, Maurice Riordan, Colm Breathnach, Southword Editions, 1 January 2006
 The Irish Writer and the World, Declan Kiberd, Cambridge University Press, 11 August 2005

References 

People from County Tipperary
Irish women novelists
Irish women dramatists and playwrights
Irish women poets
Living people
20th-century Irish poets
20th-century Irish novelists
20th-century Irish dramatists and playwrights
20th-century Irish women writers
21st-century Irish poets
21st-century Irish novelists
21st-century dramatists and playwrights
21st-century Irish women writers
Irish television writers
Women television writers
Irish children's writers
Irish women children's writers
Alumni of University College Dublin
Alumni of the London School of Journalism
Irish women journalists
Irish-language writers
21st-century Irish-language poets
Laureates na nÓg
Year of birth missing (living people)